Tripura Board of Secondary Education (TBSE) is a board of school education in the state of Tripura, India. Currently Dr.Bhabatosh Saha is the president of TBSE.It is a state agency of the Government of Tripura which is responsible for the promotion and development of secondary education in the state. Most of the public schools of the state follow the TBSE system.

History
Tripura Board of Secondary Education was established in the year 1973 under the Tripura Act. No.12 and named after Tripura Board of Secondary Education Act, 1973 by Tripura Legislative Assembly. The board came in operation from the year 1976.
This Board is also providing higher education and granting to its affiliated schools.

Board Exams
Every year Tripura Board of Secondary Education conducts 10th and 12th Board exams in Feb-March.

See also 

 Education in Tripura
 Central Board of Secondary Education (CBSE), India
 National Institute of Open Schooling (NIOS), India
 Indian Certificate of Secondary Education (ICSE), India
 Indian School Certificate (ISC),India
 Council for the Indian School Certificate Examinations (CISCE), India
 Secondary School Leaving Certificate (SSLC), India

References

External links 
 

State secondary education boards of India
State agencies of Tripura
Education in Tripura
Educational institutions established in 1976
1976 establishments in Tripura